Senator Morrill may refer to:

Edmund Needham Morrill (1834–1909), Kansas State Senate
Justin Smith Morrill (1810–1898), U.S. Senator from Vermont from 1867 to 1898
Lot M. Morrill (1813–1883), U.S. Senator from Maine from 1869 to 1876

See also
David L. Morril (1772–1849), U.S. Senator from New Hampshire from 1817 to 1823
Senator Morrell (disambiguation)